Maesteg  is a town and community in Bridgend County Borough, Wales. Maesteg lies at the northernmost end of the Llynfi Valley, close to the border with Neath Port Talbot. In 2011, Maesteg had a population of 20,612. The English translation of Maesteg is 'fair field'.

Historically a part of Glamorgan, the growth of the town started with the opening of ironworks in the 1820s, and 1830s. Once a coal mining area, the last pit closed in 1985. With the decline of the coal industry and, more recently, the closure of one large factory producing cosmetics and another manufacturing vehicle components, the valley has become a residential/dormitory area for the Port Talbot, Bridgend and Cardiff journey to work areas. 11% (1,867 out of 20,702) of the town's population speak Welsh with 27.9% of 3-15 year olds speaking the language. It is one of the few areas of Wales where the traditional Mari Lwyd is still celebrated during Christmas.

The community of Maesteg had a population of 17,580 in the 2011 census and includes Nantyffyllon. The built-up area having a population of 21,000.

History
 Before the development of industry in the 1820s, the Llynfi Valley was a sparsely populated area of scattered farms. The nearest settlement was the village of Llangynwyd located on the hillside about two miles south of the present-day town centre of Maesteg. Close to Llangynwyd is an extensive earthwork known as Y Bwlwarcau ("the bulwarks"), an Iron Age enclosure that is probably a remnant of the earliest settlement in the Llynfi district.

During the Middle Ages the valley was part of Tir Iarll (the Earl's Land), an area "famous for its game coverts, its woods and sparkling streams" that was set aside as a hunting reserve by Robert Fitzhamon, Earl of Gloucester, the Norman conqueror of Glamorgan. Up to the 18th century many of the farms of the Llynfi Valley were centres of local culture. For example, Llwydarth, the home of the influential Powell family, was a centre for writers and poets in Glamorgan in the 17th century.

According to the Daily Telegraph, Maesteg was the first place in the UK where Japanese Knotweed was spotted in the wild some time before 1886.

Industrial history
The origins of the present-day community in the Llynfi Valley date from the late 1820s when the area's considerable coal and iron ore resources were developed on an industrial scale for the first time. In 1828 a 15-mile horse-drawn railway was completed between Porthcawl and Garnlwyd in the Llynfi Valley. This was the Dyffryn Llynfi and Porthcawl Railway (DLPR); it was extended to the Coegnant district near the head of the valley in 1830. The railway opened up the district and led to the formation of an iron company which began building a works on Maesteg Uchaf Farm, near the site of the present-day town centre, in 1826. The company took its name from the farm, and by 1831 two furnaces were in blast and the first rows of workers' housing had been completed near the Maesteg Ironworks. At about the same time one of the first zinc smelters in Wales was set up on Coegnant Farm near the northern terminus of the DLPR.

In 1839 work on a second, larger, ironworks commenced at Nantycrynwydd Farm on a site now largely occupied by the Tesco store and car park. The works, which became known as the Llynfi Ironworks (or "The New Works") was started by the unsuccessful Cambrian Iron and Spelter Company and was bought by the ambitious Llynvi Iron Company in 1845. The Cornstores section of the Maesteg Sports Centre and the adjoining base of a blast furnace remain as links to the Llynfi Works and the valley's significant 19th century iron industry. The two ironworks, with associated collieries and new housing, transformed an area of scattered farms with a population of about 400 in 1821 into a growing township with a population of 4,000 by 1841.

The Cambrian/Llynfi Works attracted investment capital from a number of prominent figures of the early Victorian period, including the poet William Wordsworth, who was a Cambrian shareholder in the early 1840s, Sir Felix Booth, the gin distiller, and the writer and radical politician, Dr John Bowring. Bowring invested heavily in the Llynfi Works in the mid-1840s and, for a number of years, that part of the valley around his works was known as Bowrington. During his association with the Maesteg district he campaigned in Parliament for a decimal system of coinage and was largely responsible for the introduction of Britain's first decimal coin, the florin or two shilling piece (now the ten pence piece). John Bowring lost his capital in the trade depression of the late 1840s although the iron company continued trading. After his Llynfi venture, John Bowring became British Consul in Canton, China, and was Governor of Hong Kong 1854–59.

The iron industry in Maesteg continued, with varying degrees of success, until wrought iron making was replaced by the manufacture of cheaper, mass-produced steel during the 1870s. In its heyday, after the opening of the broad gauge, steam-hauled Llynfi Valley Railway in 1861, the Llynfi Works had a reputation for producing high-quality iron. In the mid-Victorian period there was a flourishing export trade to Southern Italy and Turkey for example, rails were exported to the United States and Llynvi "Navy Quality" No.3 Cable Iron was highly regarded by the makers of Admiralty-tested anchor chains. However, as the Llynfi site could not be adapted for the production of steel, iron making ceased in the Maesteg area in 1885.

During the mid-1880s with the closure of the Llynfi Works and its associated collieries, the Maesteg district, with a population of about 10,000, faced an uncertain future. Fortunately, the local coal industry began to expand with the formation of North's Navigation Collieries Ltd in 1889. The colliery company was led by the remarkable Colonel North, the "Nitrate King" and, some years later, in 1900, another company led by Sir Alfred Jones of the Elder Dempster shipping line also developed collieries in the valley. Due to the expansion programme set in motion by the two mining companies, two of the local, former iron company collieries were modernised (Coegnant and Garth) and two new large collieries were sunk at Caerau and St John's (Cwmdu). With the development of the coal industry, the local population increased from about 10,000 in 1891 to almost 30,000 in 1921.

During the years 1890 to 1925 the valley gained a worldwide reputation as a producer of Admiralty-grade steam coal, high quality coking coal and what was regarded as the best house coal in South Wales. As a measure of the quality of Llynfi Valley steam coal, (North's) Imperial Navigation coal was included on the prestigious Admiralty List of the twenty–six best Welsh steam coals and, in 1908, the Cunard liner Mauretania was entirely fired by Llynfi coal when the ship established a new record for crossing the Atlantic.  By the early 1920s there were over 7,000 miners at work in the valley. However, as the area depended to such a large extent on the coal export trade, it was seriously affected by the trade depression of 1928–38. During that period of acute poverty and large-scale unemployment, the population of the Llynfi Valley decreased by almost a third as many left the district to seek employment in the new light industries growing up in areas such as West London and the English Midlands.

For many years after the Second World War the local coal industry employed well over 2,000 workers and new jobs were created in local Government-built factories and in new industries in the Port Talbot and Bridgend journey-to-work areas. Due to the buoyant coal industry and the success of the new factories during the years 1950–75, the population of Maesteg and district stabilised at about 20,000, roughly the figure today. With the creation of more jobs in the Bridgend and Port Talbot districts, the Llynfi Valley gradually became a residential area, a process which speeded up with the terminal decline of the coal industry during the period 1977 to 1985.

Llynfi Valley Metal-Working Centres

Llynfi Valley Collieries

Demography

Economy

Maesteg Market Square
Maesteg Market was situated at the ground floor level of Maesteg Town Hall and offered a variety of goods until the final stallholder left in 2018.

Transport

Railway
Maesteg has three railway stations, all on the Maesteg Line. Services are operated by Transport for Wales and run directly to Cardiff Central via Bridgend. The services usually continue to Cheltenham Spa via Newport and Gloucester with one early morning service to Ebbw Vale Town. Previous, long-distance extensions, one to London Waterloo and one to Wrexham General were short lived. The terminus station is Maesteg, the other two stations are the most recently built , and Garth station which serves the Garth and Cwmfelin villages situated just outside Maesteg. A bus service used to replace a withdrawn rail service from Maesteg to Caerau, but it was removed in January 2012 due to council cutbacks.

In the past, there were other railway stations in Maesteg. Llangynwyd Station used to lie on the Maesteg line a few miles east of where Garth Station is today, and Maesteg (Neath Road) which was on the old Port Talbot Railway Line but these are now closed.

The original Maesteg railway station was situated a few yards west of the terminus that is there today. Remains of the original station are still there behind the Asda Store, including the platforms and the bridge joining the two platforms. The old track was removed in 2007 during the land reclamation project.  The present stations were reopened by British Rail in 1992.

Buses
Maesteg Bus Station is situated to the rear of the town hall.  First Cymru operate the majority of the services from this station.  Services run to Bridgend, Swansea via Port Talbot, Caerau Park, Llangynwyd and Cymmer.

Welsh language
In common with the rest of Wales, the town has two official languages, English and Welsh. The majority of people in Maesteg are native English speakers, but there is a Welsh-speaking minority. The 2011 census reported that 11% of people over the age of 3 spoke Welsh. However, there were large discrepancies between age groups.  27.9% of 3-15 year old spoke Welsh, 8.6% of 16-64 year olds spoke Welsh with the lowest proportion being among the over 65s at 5.3%.

Primary and secondary education is available through the medium of Welsh, there are Welsh-language chapels and the headquarters of Menter yr Iaith Pen-y-bont ar Ogwr is based in the town. The Welsh-language author and Welsh-medium education campaigner Norah Isaac was born and raised in Caerau. She was described as 'the most influential individual in the history of Welsh-medium education' by Iolo Wyn Williams in his book 'Our Children's Language: The Welsh-Medium Schools of Wales, 1939-2000'. Wales' first every Welsh-language nursery was opened in Maesteg in 1949.

Education
Maesteg has six English language state primary schools: Cwmfelin Primary, Plasnewydd Primary, Caerau Primary, Nantyffyllon Primary, Llangynwyd Primary and Garth Primary. There is also a Catholic primary school, St. Mary's and St. Patrick's, and a Welsh-medium school, Ysgol Cynwyd Sant. Plasnewydd School, near the town centre, is one of the biggest primary schools in the Llynfi Valley, with just over 400 pupils, and is an eco-school.

There are two comprehensive schools in Maesteg. Maesteg Comprehensive School recently moved to a new site, at a cost of £17,000,000. The Welsh-medium Ysgol Gyfun Gymraeg Llangynwyd has relocated to the previous premises of  Maesteg Comprehensive School.

The pupils of Ysgol Cynwyd Sant continue their education at Ysgol Gyfun Gymraeg Llangynwyd, and the pupils of St. Mary's and St. Patrick's pursue their secondary education in Archbishop McGrath Catholic Comprehensive School, located in Brackla, a few miles to the south.

Maesteg Town Council
Maesteg Town Council has seventeen representatives covering the four electoral wards of Maesteg East (5), Maesteg West (5), Nantyffyllon (3) and Caerau (4). Until recently, there had been a majority of Labour members for over forty years. Following mass resignations from the local Labour Party as a result of an internal row over candidate selections, several Councillors resigned from the party and now sit as independents. The make-up of the council as of June 2019 is 9 Labour and 8 Llynfi Independents members.

Religion
The largest religion in the valley is Christianity; the majority of denominations are Nonconformist.
There are many churches and chapels in the Maesteg area, several of which have been converted into flats because they are no longer used in their religious respect. There is a Kingdom Hall of Jehovah's Witnesses in one of Maesteg's villages, Nantyffyllon.

Culture
Maesteg has a tradition of music and theatre. There are many local groups providing music styles from the traditional male voice choir music and Curtain Up Youth Theatre to the more modern rock band, Funeral for a Friend, who originally hail from Maesteg.

Maesteg has a rich tradition of singing, especially in choirs. At present, there are three male voice choirs: Cor Meibion Maesteg A'r Cylch (Maesteg and District Male Voice Choir), Cor Meibion Glerwyr Maesteg Gleemen Male voice Choir, and Cor yr Hen Blwyf (the Old Parish Choir), The largest being Cor Meibion Maesteg. There are also two ladies choirs: Cor merched Cwm Llynfi (Llynfi Valley Ladies Choir) and Harmony Ladies Choir. There are two mixed choirs, Noteworthy mixed choir, and Take Note contemporary vocal group, the most untraditional of the Maesteg choirs.

Maesteg Children's Choir hosts many concerts throughout the year, and Curtain Up Youth Theatre has been performing musicals since the turn of the millennium.

Artist Christopher Williams was born in Maesteg in 1873: seven of his paintings are on display in Maesteg Town Hall.

The Welsh national anthem Hen Wlad Fy Nhadau was first performed in Maesteg, in the vestry of the original Capel Tabor which is now Maesteg Workingmen's Club.

Media
As part of Bridgend County Borough, the local radio station is 106.3 Bridge FM. Maesteg is also on the fringes of the broadcast area of the Swansea local radio stations The Wave and Swansea Bay Radio. The town is also served by three local newspapers: The Glamorgan Gazette, published weekly, has its main office in Bridgend, but prints news related to Maesteg; The Gem, formerly The Recorder, a free weekly, printed in Cowbridge, and The Llynfi News, a free monthly paper, based in Maesteg.

Sport
Maesteg is home to Maesteg Park A.F.C. an association football team founded in 1945 and affiliated to the Football Association of Wales. There are four Welsh Rugby Union teams in Maesteg. The oldest is Maesteg RFC founded in 1877, while Maesteg Harlequins RFC were formed in the 1920s.  Other rugby union teams from the area include Nantyffyllon RFC, and Maesteg Celtic RFC. Rugby league is also played in the town with South Wales Scorpions playing in the 3rd tier, Championship 1.

The town is home to two cricket clubs.  Maesteg Cricket Club was founded in 1846. The team won the South Wales Cricket Association League Cup in 2016.  Maesteg Celtic Cricket Club are based at Garth Welfare Park. They have won the Welsh Cup three times and the first division of the South Wales Cricket Association on seven occasions, including a record four times consecutively.  Both clubs play in the South Wales Cricket Association Division 1.

Notable people
See :Category:People from Maesteg
 Billy Banks (1925-1991), Wales and Great Britain rugby league player.
 Allan Bateman, Wales and British Lions, rugby union and rugby league player.
 Dave Bowen (1928–1995), Arsenal and Wales, footballer and football manager.
 Henry Bracy (1846–1917), tenor.
 Gwyn Evans, Wales and British Lions, rugby union player.
 Howell Evans (1928-2014) Actor.
 Chico Hopkins, Wales and British Lions, rugby union and rugby league player.
 Norah Isaac (1915-2003), author, pioneer of Welsh-language education.
 George Jeffries (1889–1972), founder of the worldwide Elim Pentecostal Church.
 Siân Lloyd, ITV weather presenter.
 James Morgan, actor.
 Sir Rhys Hopkin Morris, (1888–1956), politician, stipendiary magistrate, first director of the Welsh Region BBC.
 Sir William Beddoe Rees MP (1877–1931), Welsh chapel architect, town-planner and politician.
 Brinley Richards (1904–1981), Archdruid of Wales 1972–75.
 Menna Richards, Controller BBC Wales, 2000–2011.
 David Emlyn Thomas (1892–1954), politician and trade unionist.
 Rees Thomas Rugby league scrum half with Swinton and Wigan (winner Lance Todd trophy 1958).
 Thomas Llyfnwy Thomas (1912–1983), U.S.-based vocalist and T.V. personality.
 Sidney Wilcox (1893–1973), Welsh cricketer.
 Christopher Williams (1873–1934), leading artist, portrait painter.
 John J. Williams (1948–2020), Wales and British Lions, rugby union player and international athlete.

References

External links

 Maesteg

 
Towns in Bridgend County Borough
Communities in Bridgend County Borough
Swansea Bay (region)